Raymond Braun Media Group, also well known by its acronym RBMG, is a record label founded in 2008 as a joint venture by R&B artist Usher (whose surname is Raymond) and talent agent Scooter Braun. The label was initially created for both parties to mutually manage the career and recording catalogue by then-rising teen pop singer Justin Bieber.

RBMG also has a special profit-sharing business deal with Def Jam Recordings, owned by Universal Music Group.

History
Raymond and Braun founded RBMG Music in 2008, in conjunction with Island Def Jam, to debut teen singer Justin Bieber. Bieber's debut EP, My World, was the label's first release. It was certified platinum in the U.S. In March 2010, Bieber released his debut album My World 2.0, which received a Grammy Award nomination for Best Pop Vocal Album at the 2011 ceremony and was certified triple platinum by the Recording Industry Association of America (RIAA).

Artists
 Justin Bieber

Discography

References

External links
RBMG official website
SB official website

American record labels
Record labels established in 2008